The Great Comet of 1823, also designated C/1823 Y1 or Comet De Bréauté-Pons, was a bright comet visible in the last month of 1823 and the first months of 1824.

It was independently discovered by Nell de Bréauté at Dieppe on December 29, by Jean-Louis Pons on the morning of December 30, and by Wilhelm von Biela at Prague on the same morning. It was already visible to the naked eye when discovered: Pons initially thought he was seeing smoke from a chimney rising over a hill, but continued observing when he noticed it did not change appearance. He was later to note that the comet was, puzzlingly, more easily visible to the naked eye than through a telescope.

The comet was particularly known at the time for exhibiting two tails, one pointing away from the Sun and the other (termed an "anomalous tail" by Harding and Olbers) pointing towards it.

Caroline Herschel recorded an observation of the comet on January 31, 1824 as the last entry in her observing book.

Pons was also the last astronomer to detect the comet, on April 1, 1824.

References

External links 
 

Non-periodic comets
Great Comet
Great Comet
18231229
Great comets